Pierre Litoux (7 July 1902 – 12 May 1987) was a French politician.

Litoux was born on 7 July 1902 in Saint-Lyphard. He served as mayor of his hometown from May 1929 to March 1978. He was affiliated with the Union for the New Republic and represented Loire-Atlantique's 7th constituency in the National Assembly from 1962 to 1968. He died in Saint-Lyphard on 12 May 1987.

References

1902 births
1987 deaths
Mayors of places in Pays de la Loire
Deputies of the 2nd National Assembly of the French Fifth Republic
Deputies of the 3rd National Assembly of the French Fifth Republic
Union for the New Republic politicians